Château de Chaumont is a château currently in ruins, located in Chaumont, straddling the municipalities of Mainsat and La Serre-Bussière-Vieille, in the Creuse department in the Nouvelle-Aquitaine region in central France.

The path leading to the château (rue de Chaumont) is in the town of Mainsat, but the building itself is in the neighbouring town of La Serre-Bussière-Vieille.

History
The château was built in the early 20th century by a Russian industrialist for his protégé Eugénie Bardet, a young singer from Creuse.

Children's home: a refuge for Jews (1939-1945)
From 1939, the château was rented to the Œuvre de secours aux enfants (OSE) ("Children's relief work"). From 1940, the history of the château is linked to the rescue of Jews during the Second World War. The Creuse department welcomed approximately 3,000 Jews including 1,000 children between 1939 and 1945. The OSE had three secular reception centres for children in Creuse, including Chaumont, directed by Lotte Schwarz. The Synagogue de Neuilly, created in 1866 in the Paris region, moved in 1939 due to the German occupation of the city to Creuse as it was in the zone libre ("free zone").

In 1940, French humourist Popeck, then 4 years old, took refuge at the château until 1942.

At the entrance to rue de Chaumont there is a commemorative plaque.

Fire and abandonment
When Bardet died, her heirs decided to sell the château. In 1967, the château was sold to Jean-François Mironnet, steward of Coco Chanel, and his ex-model wife. Chanel has therefore never owned the premises.

In 1987, the building was destroyed by fire, with only the external walls remaining standing. Mironnet's wife, alone on the château at the time of the fire, managed to escape from the flames by tying bed sheets through a window.

In 2017, the property was for sale on the French classified ads website Leboncoin.

In October 2022, Dan Preston, an English expatriate and founder of the YouTube channel Escape to rural France, began the purchase of the château with a view to its complete restoration.

References

External links
 Instagram page

Houses in France
Buildings and structures in Creuse
Châteaux in Creuse
Castles in Nouvelle-Aquitaine
Houses completed in the 20th century
20th-century architecture in France